Alburnus sarmaticus is a species of ray-finned fish in the genus Alburnus. Widespread in European rivers: Southern Bug, Dnieper, Danube (in Romania, Ukraine and Bulgaria); River Kolpa, an upper tributary to the River Sava in Croatia and Slovenia. Almost extirpated in Danube, to be probably survived only in River Kolpa.

References

Alburnus
Fish described in 2007
Taxa named by Jörg Freyhof
Freshwater fish of Europe